Schmiede- und Schlossermuseum Schwalbach is a museum of smithery and locks in Saarland, Germany.

External links
www.touristinfo-saar.de

Museums in Saarland